Lauren Davidson (born 1 October 2001) is a Scottish footballer who plays as a forward for Glasgow City in the Scottish Women's Premier League (SWPL) and the Scotland national team.

Club career
Davidson played for the youth team of Glasgow City. After a stint with Hibernian she joined the senior squad of Glasgow City in August 2020.

International career
Davidson represented Scotland at the under-16, under-17 and under-19 levels. She was added to the full national team in September 2021 and made her international debut that month in a 2–0 win against Hungary, appearing as a late substitute for Claire Emslie.

International goals

References 

2001 births
Living people
Scottish women's footballers
Glasgow City F.C. players
Scottish Women's Premier League players
Women's association football forwards
Scotland women's international footballers
Hibernian W.F.C. players